Sericini is a tribe of scarab beetles in the family Scarabaeidae. There are at least 100 described species in Sericini. Members of this tribe can be identified using their mouthparts, specifically their three-jointed labium and asymmetric maxillae.

Genera
 Maladera Mulsant & Rey, 1871
 Nipponoserica Nomura, 1973
 Serica MacLeay, 1819

References

 Bouchard, P., Y. Bousquet, A. Davies, M. Alonso-Zarazaga, J. Lawrence, C. Lyal, A. Newton, et al. (2011). "Family-group names in Coleoptera (Insecta)". ZooKeys, vol. 88, 1–972.

Further reading

 Arnett, R. H. Jr., M. C. Thomas, P. E. Skelley and J. H. Frank. (eds.). (21 June 2002). American Beetles, Volume II: Polyphaga: Scarabaeoidea through Curculionoidea. CRC Press LLC, Boca Raton, Florida .
 
 Richard E. White. (1983). Peterson Field Guides: Beetles. Houghton Mifflin Company.

Melolonthinae
Beetle tribes